Gunsbach is a village and commune in the Haut-Rhin department in Grand Est in north-eastern France.

The first mention of Gunsbach is in 1285, when the land was given Lord Conrad Werner of Hattstatt. In 1434, Gunsbach was sold to the Ribeaupierre family, remaining in their possession until the French Revolution in 1789.

People
Albert Schweitzer grew up here in the late 19th century, when the region had been incorporated to the German Empire. The village is home to the International Albert Schweitzer Association ("AISL") with a small museum and an archive.

See also
 Communes of the Haut-Rhin département

References

Communes of Haut-Rhin
Haut-Rhin communes articles needing translation from French Wikipedia